George Noll is an American diplomat, currently serving as Chief of the U.S. Office of Palestinian Affairs at the United States Embassy in Jerusalem. He joined the United States Department of State in 1997. Noll served as a diplomat at several US embassies in South Korea, Germany, Belarus, Russia, and Norway.

References

Living people
American diplomats
Year of birth missing (living people)